Fifty Shades Darker (Original Motion Picture Soundtrack) is the soundtrack album to the 2017 film Fifty Shades Darker, an adaptation of E. L. James's novel of the same name. The soundtrack album was released through Republic Records on February 10, 2017. The lead single, "I Don't Wanna Live Forever", was performed by Taylor Swift and Zayn Malik and was released on December 9, 2016. The single was commercially successful, reaching number five on United Kingdom and number two on the Billboard Hot 100. The film's soundtrack was released in two separate versions; one for the 19 popular artists songs used in the film, and another separate release for the original score composed for the film by Danny Elfman. Two of Elfman's themes were also included on the popular artists version of the soundtrack release.

Singles 
The lead single "I Don't Wanna Live Forever", a duet between musicians Taylor Swift and Zayn Malik, was released on December 9, 2016. The song peaked at number 2 on the Billboard Hot 100. A music video was released on January 27, 2017. The second official single, "Not Afraid Anymore" by Halsey, was released on January 13, 2017, and reached number 77 on the Hot 100. The album tracks "Bom Bidi Bom" by Nick Jonas and Nicki Minaj and "Helium" by Sia debuted on the Hot 100 at number 54 and 71, respectively. Although not officially singles, the songs have received airplay.

Track listing

Charts
The album debuted at No. 1 on the Billboard 200 chart, earning 123,000 equivalent album units in the week ending February 16. Of that sum, 72,000 were in traditional album sales.

Weekly charts

Year-end charts

Certifications

See also
 Danny Elfman discography
 List of best-selling albums in China

References

2017 soundtrack albums
Fifty Shades film music
Republic Records soundtracks
Universal Music Group soundtracks
Albums produced by Jack Antonoff
Albums produced by Danny Elfman
Albums produced by Don Was
Albums produced by The-Dream
Albums produced by Toby Gad
Albums produced by the Messengers (producers)
Albums produced by Jason Evigan
Romance film soundtracks
Drama film soundtracks